James, Jamie, Jim or Jimmy McIntosh may refer to:

 James Mackintosh (percussionist), Scottish percussionist and drummer
 James M. McIntosh (1828–1862), Confederate Army general
 James McIntosh (Medal of Honor) (1829–1908), American Medal of Honor recipient
 James McIntosh (rower) (1930–2018), American rower
 Jamie McIntosh (fl. 2002–2012), director of International Justice Mission Canada
 James McIntosh (footballer, born 1886) (1886–1959), Scottish footballer
 James McIntosh (food writer) (born 1978), Northern Irish food writer
 Jim McIntosh (born 1950), Scottish footballer
 Jimmy McIntosh (1918–2000), Scottish footballer and manager
 Jimmy McIntosh (baseball), American baseball player
 Jimmy McIntosh (footballer, born 1936) (1936–2016), Scottish footballer

See also
 James Mackintosh (1765–1832), Scottish jurist, Whig politician and historian